Mulberry Downs Quarry is a disused opencast tin mine in Cornwall, England, UK. The quarry was designated as a Site of Special Scientific Interest (SSSI) in 1973 for its geological interest.

History
The mine, known as Mulberry Hill Mine and locally just as Mulberry Mine has been producing tin since Roman times.  The tin deposit itself has been described as "best example of a stockwork tin ore deposit in Britain"

Although the mine is opencast, two adits were run from the base of the quarry, however the current depth of the workings is consistent with the water table measured at nearby boreholes and as there is not any record of an engine house or pump at the mine it is unclear whether these were effective in increasing the depth that mining could take place.

Geology
The quarry runs almost directly north-south, and follows veins of selenium and iron that run through the middle devonian bedrock. Below  there are also ores of arsenic and copper.

Geography
Tin is a necessary component of bronze, and export from Mulberry Mine to the Mediterranean could easily have been via Tintagel or the much nearer settlement on Stepper Point which was occupied in the Bronze Age, Iron Age and the Roman period.

In 1834 the Bodmin and Wadebridge Railway opened, with a branch line to Ruthernbridge provided to convey the output of the nearby mines, including Mulberry Mine, out to Wadebridge for transfer to sailing vessels for onward transport.

The  disused mine, located within the civil parish of Lanivet, was originally notified as an SSSI in 1973. A second notification in 1985 increased the area slightly to  The site was most recently surveyed in 2011 when the condition was described as favourable.

Notes

References

Citations

References
 

Mines in Cornwall
Quarries in Cornwall
Sites of Special Scientific Interest in Cornwall
Sites of Special Scientific Interest notified in 1973
1859 establishments in the United Kingdom
Non-renewable resource companies established in 1859
Non-renewable resource companies disestablished in 1916
1916 disestablishments in the United Kingdom